"Forever Summer Holiday" is a song by Kero Kero Bonito, being a single from their first studio album Bonito Generation. The single is noted on neither the UK nor the US charts. Like many KKB songs, "Forever Summer Holiday" features lyrics in both English and Japanese, as well as a mixture of singing and rap.

Music video
The official video for the song was released on 29 June 2017 and uploaded to YouTube. It was directed by Theo Davies. The video revolves around the band members going on a titular summer holiday to the beach.

Release history

References

2017 singles
2017 songs
Kero Kero Bonito songs